Spokane International may refer to:
Spokane International Airport
Spokane International Railroad